Javier 'Javi' Ballesteros Tomás (born 21 August 1984 in Montamarta, Province of Zamora, is a Spanish footballer who plays as a striker.

External links

1984 births
Living people
Sportspeople from the Province of Zamora
Spanish footballers
Footballers from Castile and León
Association football forwards
Segunda División players
Segunda División B players
Tercera División players
CD Guijuelo footballers
Zamora CF footballers
Atlético Madrid B players
SD Eibar footballers
CD Puertollano footballers
CD Lugo players
Lleida Esportiu footballers
CD Leganés players
Cultural Leonesa footballers